FK Ventspils is a Latvian football club, based at Ventspils Olimpiskais Stadions in Ventspils city and is one of the most popular football clubs in the country. The club played in the Latvian Virsliga since 1997. It was abolished in 2020, but has since returned to Latvian football and competes in the Latvian First League as of 2023.

In total, FK Ventspils has won six league titles and seven Latvian Cups. They became Latvian Higher League champions in 2006, 2007, 2008, 2011, 2013 and 2014. In 2009 FK Ventspils became the first Latvian club to participate in the group stages of a UEFA competition after beating BATE Borisov from Belarus.

History

FK Ventspils was founded in 1997 with the merger of two former Ventspils clubs – FK Venta and FK Nafta. Its predecessor, Venta, was one of the leading clubs in the Latvian league in the 1960s.

FK Venta

The next notable success for “Venta” was in 1967, when they won the Latvian Cup. By that time they had quite a fighting fit line-up, and 1969 already was their golden year when Venta became champions. During the tournament they gained 43 points; 20 matches won, 3 matches ended with a draw and only 3 matches lost. Additionally, they lost only in the away matches. They scored 45 goals and 16 conceded. At that time Venta's leader was a player manager, who is well known not only to the admirers of Ventspils, but the whole of Latvian football, Vladimir Chikinov.

This was the golden line-up: Leonid Virko, Konstantin Zhurkevich, Aleksandr Busarov, Valery Yashenko, Aleksandr Tronev, Ariy Shmerling, Vladimir Samohvalov, Aleksandr Novash, Nikolay Chaevky, Nikolay Pozdnyakov, Vladimir Chikinov, Viktor Yurinov, Viktor Litvinenko, Aleksandr Rakicky, Valentin Ipolitov, Vladimir Kutuzov, Valentin Vetrenko, Genady Hrustalov.

Of course, the victories did not come easy. There was a huge effort put into both – the matches and training. However, at that time they had quite a modest material and technical basis. They trained in the sport hall of Ventspils port, had training camps in Piltene and went to Moldova several times. They had close contacts with a children’s sport school from which talented youth players often came into the team. Whereas these days there are limits on foreign born players, at that time it was an obligation for the team to have two players younger than 18 years of age in the line-up. Thus, V. Kutuzov, V. Ivankovich, N. Dishlov and later Y. Romanenko, V. Fedotov and others appeared in the team.

In 1963 Ventspils gained a place and the rights to play in the Latvian championship (Virsliga). The next major achievement for "Venta" came in 1967, when it won the Latvian Cup. In 1969 "Venta" were champions of Latvia, in that season "Venta" got 43 points, 20 matches won, three drawn and three lost. In the 1970s the team lost its position, in the 1980s it lost its financial support and became defunct for some years. In 1994 Venta returned to 1. līga but after that season many players left the club as FK Nafta was formed. Until the merger Venta played in 1. liga.

FK Nafta

FK Nafta was formed in 1995, in the first season the club won its 2nd league division and earned a promotion to the 1st league. In its only season there the club finished higher than FK Venta. After the season the teams merged to form FK Ventspils.

FK Ventspils

The recent history of “Ventspils” began in 1997, the year of the team’s foundation. In February 2007, the club that represents the town on the bank of the river Venta with a population of 45 thousand people, celebrated its 10th anniversary. In a relatively short period of time FK “Ventspils” has become one of the strongest clubs in Latvia. FK “Ventspils” has rapidly developed and gained a reputation of a serious Latvian club, winning various trophies.

In 2003 FK "Ventspils” won the Latvian Cup for the first time in the club's history. The team won this trophy the next two years in a row. And only the main trophy – golden medal of the Latvian championship – hadn't been achieved for a long time. The team won silver and bronze medals of the Latvian championship several times, and, finally, in 2006 FK "Ventspils" became the champions of Latvia.

The Ukrainian specialist Roman Hryhorchuk led FK Ventspils to the main trophy. Prior to that, in 2003, FK Ventspils had won the Latvian Cup for the first time. Also, in 2004 and in 2005, FK Ventspils won the trophy, but only finished second and third in the Latvian championship. Before Hryhorchuk the team was managed by Russian coach Boris Sinicin, English coach Paul Anthony Ashworth, Lithuanian specialist Saulius Širmelis and the Latvian local Sergejs Semjonovs.

Despite being a relatively new club, FK Ventspils has also had a quite rich and interesting history in the Eurocups. In 1999 FK Ventspils had its debut in the Intertoto Cup and beat Norwegian team Vålerenga on aggregate. Later the club took part in the UEFA Cup, thus allowing fans to see matches against such famous European clubs as Stuttgart, Rosenborg, Brøndby and Newcastle United. The 0–0 draw in the away match against Newcastle United might have been called the greatest achievement of FK Ventspils until 2009. However, even more memorable were the matches against Brøndby in 2004, when FK Ventspils eliminated the Danish club from the UEFA Cup.

On 17 July 2007 FK Ventspils made its debut in the UEFA Champions League. The yellow-and-blue started their historical trip of the most prestigious club tournament in Europe in Wales, where they played against TNS. The author of the first FK Ventspils goal in the Champions League was forward Vits Rimkus. One week later, on 25 July, FK Ventspils achieved their first victory in the Champions league, beating TNS 2–1 at home. Goals were scored by defenders Jean-Paul Ndeki and Deniss Kačanovs. In the second qualifying round the Roman Hryhorchuk's team played against Red Bull Salzburg, led by the legendary Italian specialist Giovanni Trapattoni and lost. In 2008 FK Ventspils participated in the Champions league for the second time. The first opponents of the team were again the champions of Wales, Llanelli.

UEFA Europa league Group stage 2009/10

In the 2009–10 season FK Ventspils became the first Latvian club to participate in the group stages of UEFA club competitions after beating BATE Borisov from Belarus in the last UEFA Europa League qualification round. FK Ventspils opponents in the group stages were Sporting CP from Portugal, Hertha BSC from Germany and Heerenveen from the Netherlands. Adding several experienced players to the squad, FK Ventspils showed a remarkable performance, playing 1–1 draws away in the Olympiastadion in Berlin and Estádio José Alvalade in Lisbon. They also kept a 0–0 draw against Heerenveen at home. With three points in six matches, FK Ventspils finished last in Group D, failing to qualify for the UEFA Europa League group stages.

In 2010 FK Ventspils won the 2009–10 Baltic League. They finished second in the national championship, qualifying for the UEFA Europa League first qualification stage. The club was knocked out of the tournament in the third qualification stage by Red Star Belgrade. In 2011, they won the national championship, securing their fourth league title. In 2013 FK Ventspils won the league for the fifth time and lifted the Latvian Cup for the sixth time in the club's history. In the middle of 2013 the club participated in the UEFA Europa League qualification stages, reaching the third qualification stage. They knocked out the Welsh champions Airbus UK Broughton and Luxembourg National Division club Jeunesse Esch, but lost to the Israeli club Maccabi Haifa.

Disqualification

On 9 June 2021, UEFA banned FK Ventspils from participating in UEFA club competitions for the next seven years (i.e. up to and including the 2027–28 season) for violating UEFA regulations related to "fraud, bribery and/or corruption" and for "violation of the integrity of matches and competitions". Club officials Nikolajs Djakins and Adlan Shishkanov were banned from football for 4 years and for life, respectively. The charges were related to July 2018 Europa League qualifier against  Bordeaux, Russian referee Sergey Lapochkin who was refereeing that game was banned from football activity for 10 years.

Team honours
 Virslīga: 6
 2006, 2007, 2008, 2011, 2013, 2014
 Latvian Cup: 7
 2003, 2004, 2005, 2007, 2010–11, 2012–13, 2016–17
 Baltic League: 1
 2009–10
 Livonia Cup
 Winners (1): 2008

Individual honours

Participation in Latvian Championships

Participation in Baltic League

European record

Sponsors

Notable former players
Past (and present) players who are the subjects of Wikipedia articles can be found here.

Managers

References

External links
Official website 
Latvian Football Federation website 
Ventspils FK at the UEFA official website
Ventspils FK at the World Football.net

 
Ventspils
Sport in Ventspils
Ventspils
1997 establishments in Latvia